Allan Chadwick is an Australian Paralympic shooter. At the 1984 New York/Stoke Mandeville Games, he won a gold medal in the Men's Rifle Prone – Tetraplegic (Aids) 1A–1C event. He also competed in shooting but did not win any medals at the 1988 Seoul Games.

References

Paralympic shooters of Australia
Shooters at the 1984 Summer Paralympics
Shooters at the 1988 Summer Paralympics
Medalists at the 1984 Summer Paralympics
Paralympic gold medalists for Australia
Paralympic medalists in shooting
Wheelchair category Paralympic competitors
People with tetraplegia
Year of birth missing (living people)
Living people